The Southern Theater Command Navy, or the South Sea Fleet (SSF) is one of the three fleets of the Chinese People's Liberation Army Navy, operating in the South China Sea under the Southern Theater Command. It is headquartered in Zhanjiang, Guangdong Province. 

Initially, the fleet's strength consisted mostly of former Kuomintang ships and personnel, which either defected or were captured by the People's Liberation Army. One of three fleets of the People's Liberation Army Navy, the SSF's duties were to protect the city of  Guangzhou and the Pearl River regions, and support the PLA in capturing islands that were still in the hands of the Kuomintang forces. The fleet's development has been slow, because most of China's shipbuilding industry is located on the northern or eastern coasts. In the 1970s the fleet underwent a major buildup, due to conflict in the Paracel Islands and other reefs in the South China Sea. In 1974, the SSF took the Paracel Islands from South Vietnam, which resulted in the sinking of one South Vietnamese frigate while damaging another. The latest incident was in 1988, when a Chinese naval task force engaged Vietnamese naval forces, sinking one Vietnamese warship and damaging another.

Most of the fleet's surface ships are located at Zhanjiang naval base, while all of the fleet's submarines are at Yulin Naval Base, on Hainan Island. The SSF has many other bases included Guangzhou, Haikou, Shantou, Mawei, and Beihai, while naval air force bases are at Lingshui, Haikou, Sanya, Zhanjiang, and Guiping. The fleet's area of operations is divided into six zones.

Structure

Functional Departments 
The South Sea Fleet consists of the following departments:
 General Staff Department - Fleet Headquarters Staff.
 Political Work Department - Responsible for Communist Party oversight over the fleet.
 Discipline Inspection Committee - Responsible for maintaining discipline in the fleet.
 Equipment Department
 Logistics Department

Naval Detachments 
South Sea Fleet further divides into the following ship detachments:
 2nd Destroyer Detachment (驱逐舰第二支队)
 9th Destroyer Detachment (驱逐舰第九支队)
 17th Frigate Detachment (护卫舰第十七支队)
 18th Frigate Detachment (护卫舰第十八支队)
 19th Frigate Detachment (护卫舰第十九支队)
 32nd Submarine Detachment (潜艇第三十二支队)
 52nd Submarine Detachment (潜艇第五十二支队)
 6th Landing Ship Detachment (登陆舰第六支队)
 3rd Combat Support Ship Detachment (作战支援舰第三支队)
 Danger and Lifesaver Detachment (某防险救生支队)

Major Naval Bases in the Fleet
The fleet headquarters was, at first, at Guangzhou, but was later relocated to Zhanjiang.

 Yulin Naval Base, Hainan Island
 Guangzhou
 Haikou
 Shantou
 Mawei
 Beihai
 Stonecutters Island, Hong Kong - People's Liberation Army Hong Kong Garrison

Naval air force bases:

 Lingshui
 Haikou
 Sanya
 Zhanjiang
 Guiping

Ships in the fleet

The flagship of the fleet is the Shandong (17), a Kuznetsov-class aircraft carrier.

Aircraft carrier
 1 Kuznetsov-class:
 Shandong (17)
Landing helicopter dock
 Type 075
 Hainan (31)Destroyers: 
 1 Type 055 destroyer
 Dalian (105)
 7 Type 052D/Kunming/Luyang III-class:
 Kunming (172)
 Changsha (173)
 Hefei (174)
 Yinchuan (175)
Hohhot (161)
Nanning (162)
 2 Type 052C/Lanzhou/Luyang II-class:
 Lanzhou (170)
 Haikou (171)
 2 Type 052B/Guangzhou/Luyang-class:
 Guangzhou (168)
 Wuhan (169)
 1 Type 051B/Luhai-class:
 Shenzhen (167)Frigates: 8  Jiangkai-class II:
 Huangshan (570)
 Hengyang (568)
 Yuncheng (571)
 Yulin (569)
 Hengshui (572)
 Liuzhou (573)
 Sanya (574)
 Yueyang (575)
 3 Jiangwei II-class:
 Yichang (564)
 Huaihua (566)
 Xiangyang (567)
 6 Jianghu V-class:
 Beihai (558)
 Kangding (559)
 Dongguan (560)
 Shantou (561)
 Jiangmen (562)
 Foshan (563)Corvettes: 
 12 Jiangdao-class:
 Meizhou (584)
 Baise (585)
 Jieyang (587)
 Qingyuan (589)
 Luzhou (592)
 Zhuzhou (594)
 Chaozhou (595)
 Suqian (504)
 Jingmen (506)
 Tongren (507)
 Qujing (508)
 Liupanshui (514)Diesel-Electric submarines: 
 8 Ming-classLanding ships:  
 3 Yuzhao-class LPD:
 Kunlun Shan (998)
 Jinggang Shan (999)
 Changbai Shan (989)
 6 Yuting III-class LST:
 Huading Shan (992)
 Luoxiao Shan (993)
 Daiyun Shan (994)
 Wanyang Shan (995)
 Laotie Shan (996)
 Lühua Shan (997)
 1 Yuting II-class LST:
 Emei Shan (992)
 3 Yuting-class LST:
 Dongting Shan (931)
 Helan Shan (932)
 Liupan Shan (933)
 4 Yudao-Class LSMsReplenishment ships:1 Fusu-class
 Qinghaihu (885)
3 Fuchi-class
 Weishanhu (887)
 Honghu (963)
 Luomahu (964)
5 Dayun-class
 Jingpohu (884)
 Dongtinghu (883)
 Fuxianhu (888)
 Junshanhu (961)
 Luguhu (962)Auxiliary ships:' 6 Qiongsha-class troop transport ships:
 NY830 NY831 NY832 NY833 NY834 NY835''
 1 hospital ship

See also 
 People's Liberation Army Navy
 North Sea Fleet
 East Sea Fleet
 Nanyang Fleet (Southern Seas Fleet), Fujian Fleet and Guangdong Fleet were the predecessor fleets of the Qing navy

References

External links 
 http://www.globalsecurity.org/military/world/china/south-sea.htm

 
Fleets of the People's Liberation Army Navy
South China Sea
Southern Theater Command
Guangzhou Military Region
Military units and formations established in 1949
1949 establishments in China